This is a list of Bangladeshi films that are scheduled to release in 2022. Some films have announced release dates but have yet to begin filming, while others are in production but do not yet have definite release dates. Films listed as "untitled" do not yet have publicly announced titles.

2022 is scheduled to release numerous notable films that were originally scheduled for release in 2020 or 2021, but were postponed due to the COVID-19 pandemic, releasing theatrically, on video on demand or on streaming services.

Box Office Collection
The top ten highest-grossing Bangladeshi films released in 2022, by worldwide box office gross revenue, are as follows.

Background color  indicates the current releases

January–March

April–June

July–September

October–December

See also

 List of Bangladeshi films of 2023
 List of Bangladeshi films of 2021
 List of Bangladeshi films of 2020
 List of Bangladeshi films
 Cinema of Bangladesh

References

Film
Lists of 2022 films by country or language
 2022